Cashmere is an unincorporated community in Monroe County, West Virginia, United States. Cashmere is located on West Virginia Route 12, north of Peterstown.

The community was named after Kashmir in Asia.

References

Unincorporated communities in Monroe County, West Virginia
Unincorporated communities in West Virginia